Sir Godfrey Way Mitchell (31 October 1891 – 9 December 1982) was a construction engineer and entrepreneur who built up George Wimpey into a thriving business.

Career
Born in Peckham and educated at Haberdashers' Aske's School at Hatcham, Godfrey Mitchell joined Rowe & Mitchell, his father's quarrying business on Alderney on leaving school. He was given a temporary commission in the Royal Engineers in 1916 and served in France.

On demobilisation he returned to England and acquired George Wimpey turning it from a small construction company into a thriving business that exploited the need for new housing after World War I. He was Chairman of the Company from 1930 to 1973 and Life President from 1973 until his death.

A keen amateur cricketer, he also served as Master of the Worshipful Company of Paviors in 1948.

Godfrey Mitchell was knighted in 1948. In 1957 he became a member of the Restrictive Practices Court.

He died in Beaconsfield in 1982.

Family
In 1929 he married Doreen Lilian and together they went on to have two daughters.

He was the uncle of Nobel Prize winner Peter D. Mitchell.

References

1891 births
1982 deaths
English civil engineers
Engineers from London
Conservative Party (UK) parliamentary candidates
People from Peckham